Project Verona is an experimental research programming language developed by Microsoft and aimed at dealing with memory situations to make other programming languages safer.

The project is being supported by C# project manager Mads Torgensen and Microsoft Research Cambridge research software engineer Juliana Franco. Project Verona is also being aided by academics at Imperial College London. Unlike in Rust where the ownership model based on a single object, it is based on groups of objects in Verona.

According to Microsoft, the goal of the project is to create a safer platform for memory management.

Project Verona is open source released under MIT License and is under active development on GitHub.

Example
while_sum(x: List[U32]) : U32
{
  var sum: U32 = 0;
  let iter = x.values();

  while { iter.has_value() }
  {
    // This has to be `a`, same as in the for loop above
    let a = iter();

    // Increments the iterator
    next iter;

    // This is the body of the for loop
    sum = sum + a
  }

  sum
}

See also

List of programming language researchers
Go (programming language)
Rust (programming language)
Cyclone (programming language)

References

External links
Project Verona - Microsoft Research

Microsoft Research
Systems programming languages
2019 software
High-level programming languages
Programming languages created in 2019
Cross-platform software
Software using the MIT license
Free and open-source software
Microsoft free software
Microsoft programming languages